Cucujinus is a genus of beetles in the family Laemophloeidae, containing the following species:

 Cucujinus brevipennis Grouvelle
 Cucujinus coquereli Grouvelle
 Cucujinus curtipennis Grouvelle
 Cucujinus micromma Arrow, 1920
 Cucujinus nebulosus Grouvelle

References

Laemophloeidae
Cucujoidea genera